The 2017 1. deild was the 75th season of the second tier of football in the Faroe Islands. AB Argir won this season, allowing them to promote to the 2018 Faroe Islands Premier League. B36 Tórshavn II and ÍF Fuglafjørður II were both relegated to the 2018 2. deild. The season started on the 11th of March and ended on the 21st of October.

Teams

The bottom two teams from the 2016 season, B68 Toftir and AB, were relegated to the 2017 1. deild. They were replaced by EB/Streymur and 07 Vestur, champions and runners-up of the 2016 1. deild respectively.

Source: Scoresway

League table

References

2
1. deild seasons